Tony Birch (born 1957) is an Aboriginal Australian author, academic and activist. He regularly appears on ABC local radio and Radio National shows and at writers’ festivals. He was head of the honours programme for creative writing at the University of Melbourne before becoming the first recipient of the Dr Bruce McGuinness Indigenous Research Fellowship at Victoria University in Melbourne in June 2015.

In 2017 he became the first Indigenous writer to win the Patrick White Award.

Background, early life and education 
Birch's maternal great-grandfather was an Afghan who migrated to Australia in 1890, who had to get exemption from the Immigration Restriction Act 1901 to take his wife home to meet the family. He also has Barbadian convict (James "Prince" Moodie, transported to Tasmania for 14 years for "disobedience") and Aboriginal heritage.

Birch was born around 1957 and has grown up around Fitzroy, a working-class suburb of Melbourne considered a slum. After being expelled from school for the second time, he left school aged 15 and became a telegram boy on a bicycle.

Career
After spending a decade as a firefighter, Birch attended Melbourne university as a mature student when he was 30 years old. In 2003 he was awarded the Chancellor's Medal for the best PhD in Arts.

Birch has appeared on ABC radio on shows such as Conversations with Richard Fidler, Life Matters and RN Afternoons.

His work involves academic research, creative writing projects, student mentoring, lecturing and community engagement.

Birch was appointed Boisbouvier Chair in Australian Literature at the University of Melbourne in December 2022.

Activism
Birch is politically active in the climate change and native title movements. In his novels, he has incorporated themes affecting Indigenous people, such as colonial oppression, dispossession, the Stolen Generations and generational violence, but weaves them creatively into the stories. He donates a portion of any prize money to the Indigenous youth organisation dedicated to climate justice, Seed.

Bibliography

Novels
 
 Ghost River (2015) 
 Shadowboxing (Scribe, 2006) , reissued by Scribe Publications in 2010, 
 The White Girl (University of Queensland Press, 2019)

Short story collections

 Father's Day (Hunter Publishers, 2009) 
 The Promise: Stories (University of Queensland Press, 2014), 
 Common People (University of Queensland Press, 2017)
 Dark as Last Night, (University of Queensland Press, 2021)

Poetry

 Broken Teeth (Cordite Books, 2016) 
 Whisper Songs (University of Queensland Press, 2021)

Anthologies 

 Anita Heiss (ed.), Growing Up Aboriginal In Australia, (Black Inc, 2018) ISBN 9781863959810

Book reviews

Awards and honours
 Shadowboxing (2006), shortlisted Queensland Premier's Literary Awards — Arts Queensland Steele Rudd Australian Short Story Award 2006
 Shadowboxing (2010 reissue), commended, Kate Challis RAKA Award 2011 
 Blood, shortlisted Miles Franklin Literary Award 2012 
 Blood, finalist Melbourne Prize — Best Writing Award 2012
 Blood, winner Melbourne Prize — Civic Choice Award 2012
 Blood, highly commended  The Fellowship of Australian Writers Victoria Inc. National Literary Awards — FAW Christina Stead Award 2011
 The Promise : Stories, shortlisted Victorian Premier's Literary Award for Indigenous Writing 2014' The Promise : Stories, shortlisted Queensland Literary Awards — Australian Short Story Collection - Steele Rudd Award 2014
 First recipient of the Dr Bruce McGuinness Indigenous Research Fellowship at Victoria University, Melbourne, June 2015
 Ghost River, longlisted Miles Franklin Literary Award 2016 Ghost River, winner Victorian Premier's Literary Awards — Prize for Indigenous Writing 2017 
  Patrick White Award 2017 (first Indigenous writer to receive the award)Common People, shortlisted Victorian Premier's Literary Awards — Prize for Indigenous Writing 2019 The White Girl, winner, Indigenous Writers' Prize, New South Wales Premier's Literary Awards 2020 The White Girl, 2020 shortlisted, Miles Franklin Literary AwardDark as Last Night, winner, Christina Stead Prize for Fiction, New South Wales Premier's Literary Awards 2022Dark as Last Night, winner, University of Southern Queensland Steele Rudd Award for a Short Story Collection, Queensland Literary Awards 2022Dark as Last Night,'' shortlisted, Prime Minister's Literary Award for fiction 2022

References

1957 births
Living people
21st-century Australian novelists
Australian poets
Australian Book Review people
Indigenous Australian writers
Australian people of Afghan descent
Australian people of Barbadian descent
Australian people of Irish descent
Australian people of Punjabi descent
Urban historians
Writers from Melbourne
People from Fitzroy, Victoria